Group A of UEFA Euro 2012 was played from 8 to 16 June 2012. The pool was made up of co-host Poland, Czech Republic, Greece and Russia. The top two finishing teams, Czech Republic and Greece, progressed to the quarter-finals, while Russia and Poland were eliminated from the tournament.

Teams

Notes

Standings

In the quarter-finals,
The winner of Group A, Czech Republic, advanced to play the runner-up of Group B, Portugal.
The runner-up of Group A, Greece, advanced to play the winner of Group B, Germany.

Matches

Poland vs Greece

Russia vs Czech Republic

Greece vs Czech Republic

Poland vs Russia

Czech Republic vs Poland

Greece vs Russia

References

External links
UEFA Euro 2012 Group A

Group A
Poland at UEFA Euro 2012
Russia at UEFA Euro 2012
Czech Republic at UEFA Euro 2012
Greece at UEFA Euro 2012